Sa Gojō (沙悟凈) (occasionally Sha Gojō) can refer to various characters based on Sha Wujing, such as:

 The Japanese name of the Journey to the West character Sha Wujing
 The character "Sandy" in the Monkey TV series
 Sha Gojyo (Saiyuki), in the manga Saiyuki